Gunther Kaschlun (9 February 1935 – 20 July 2020) was a West German rower who represented the United Team of Germany. He competed at the 1956 Summer Olympics in Melbourne with the men's coxless four where they were eliminated in the semi-final.

He died in July 2020 at the age of 85.

References

1935 births
2020 deaths
West German male rowers
Olympic rowers of the United Team of Germany
Rowers at the 1956 Summer Olympics
Sportspeople from Essen
European Rowing Championships medalists